Glycosmis pentaphylla is a species of flowering plant in the family Rutaceae, known commonly as orangeberry and gin berry. It occurs in Southeast Asia and northern Australia. It is cultivated for its edible pink fruits. In temperate zones, it can be cultivated indoors as a houseplant.

Images

References

pentaphylla
Edible fruits